Zinaida Petrovna Botschantzeva (10 October 1907 – 17 August 1973) was a Soviet and Russian botanist, cytologist, embryologist, and professor of the Tashkent university.

Botschantzeva came from a large Cossack family. In 1930 she graduated with a biology degree from the National University of Uzbekistan. In 1930-1933 she participated in expeditions to study the flora of Central Asia. Her research advisor was Alexei Ivanovich Vvedensky.

Botschantzeva conducted her own research the National University of Uzbekistan where she became a professor in 1966. Her main research interests were the morphology, cytology and biology of wild plants, especially of tulips, which later made her a pioneer in this field. She was the head of departments of biology and cytology of the Botanical Garden of the Academy of Sciences of Uzbekistan. She was the author of more than 50 scientific papers. In 1960 she defended her doctoral thesis on the Morphology, Cytology and Biology of Tulips. Her dissertation was included into a monograph that was published in 1962. The book was rich in material on Central Asian and Caucasus wild tulips. This remarkable work was reissued in 1981 in the Netherlands and translated into English in 1982.

She has described 6 new tulip species from various regions of Central Asia:

 Tulipa vvedenskyi Botschantz.
 Tulipa affinis Botschantz.
 Tulipa butkovii Botschantz.
 Tulipa anadroma Botschantz.
 Tulipa tschimganica Botschantz.
 Tulipa uzbekistanica Botschantz. & Sharipov
The botanist Victor Botchantsev was a younger brother of Botschantzeva. She was awarded with the Order of Lenin and the Order of the Red Banner of Labour. Buried at the Botkin Cemetery in Tashkent.

Works

Named for
 Tulipa zenaidae Vved.
 Tulipa botschantzevae S.N.Abramova & Zakalyabina.
 Iris zenaidae (Vved.)

References

1907 births
1973 deaths
National University of Uzbekistan alumni
Recipients of the Order of Lenin
Recipients of the Order of the Red Banner of Labour
Botanists with author abbreviations
Soviet women scientists
Soviet botanists